On 8 August 2022, large scale floods hit the capital of South Korea, Seoul, especially  Gangnam District and surrounding areas. It was preceded by the highest rainfall in 80 years. 2,800 buildings were damaged and at least 9 people were killed. 163 people in Seoul were made homeless. 50 cities and towns were issued with landslide warnings. Power cuts were widespread. President Yoon Suk-yeol warned the public of more rainfall. The highest recorded rainfall was 17 inches (43cm) Seoul's Dongjak district.

Response 
Many celebrities donated money to help the relief efforts through the Hope Bridge Korea Disaster Relief Association and the Seoul Community Chest of Korea (Seoul Fruit of Korea) including; Hong Soo-hyun, Im Si-wan, Jinyoung, Kim Hei-sook, Kim Hye-soo, Kim Jin-woo, Yoo Byung-jae, Kang Tae-oh, Lee Young-ji, Yoon Se-ah, Psy, Arin, Kang Seung-yoon, Yoo Jae-suk, Kim Go-eun, Lee Sung-kyung, Jay Park, Mijoo, IU, Bae Suzy, Ahn Hyo-seop, J-Hope, Kim Eun-sook, Kim Se-jeong, Ahn Young-mi, Lee Young-ae, Shin Hye-sun and Han Ji-min.

See also 
 2020 South Korean floods
)

References 

2022 floods in Asia
August 2022 events in South Korea
Floods in South Korea
2022 disasters in South Korea